Andy Thomas (born 16 December 1962) is an English retired professional footballer who played for Oxford United, Fulham, Derby County, Newcastle United, Bradford City and Plymouth Argyle. He later joined Oxford City, managing them between the 1994–95 and 1996–97 seasons. He also managed Chesham United during the 1997–98 season.

References

External links

1962 births
Living people
English footballers
English football managers
Oxford United F.C. players
Fulham F.C. players
Derby County F.C. players
Newcastle United F.C. players
Bradford City A.F.C. players
Plymouth Argyle F.C. players
Oxford City F.C. players
Oxford City F.C. managers
Chesham United F.C. managers
Association football midfielders